Museum of Communism may refer to:

Museum of Communism, Czech Republic
 Museum of Communism, Poland
Global Museum on Communism, an online museum by the Victims of Communism Memorial Foundation